Love by Chance: The Series is a 2018 Thai BL drama series based on My Accidental Love Is You รักนี้บังเอิญคือคุณ by MAME12938, a novel that has been popular in Dek-D.com by the ratings at 97%. The story describes the love story of two people who coincidentally met and helped each other without the suitability of each other in various aspects. It is directed by Siwaj Sawatmaneekul. 
It is finally aired on GMM 25 on August 3, 2018, and re-released (Exclusive Rerun) on LINE TV, with over 118 million views. The series is a very popular BL series in East and Southeast Asia, and parts of Europe, North and South America. The second season premiered on September 2, 2020 with a focus on the characters Tin and Can.

Synopsis

Season 1
The story of Ae (Tanapon Sukumpantanasan), a freshman from Engineering School and also a member of the college football team, who accidentally helps Pete (Suppapong Udomkaewkanjana), a handsome freshman from International College, from his ex-boyfriend who's blackmailing Pete with a clip that exposes his homosexuality to Pete's mother. 
Ae helps Pete without expecting anything in return, but he doesn't know Pete's already greatly drawn by his kindness and gentle nature and has begun to develop feelings for him. Unbeknownst to Pete, Ae is also drawn to Pete's innocence and immense kindness. But Pete is wary and knows painfully well that he's different than many other boys due to his sexuality. He feels he would rather keep his feelings hidden than destroy his new friendship with Ae. However, with time and patience their relationship starts to grow and they become closer than either of them could have ever imagined.

Season 2
Growing up in a wealthy family, Tin (Phiravich Attachitsataporn) had always enjoyed the privileges that inherently came with wealth. Never denied a thing, he had the world at his fingertips, yet his heart constantly reminded him that there were more important things in life than wealth and privilege. But with people using him as a means to better their own lives, he had little chance to explore the desire of his own heart. Suspicious of anyone who ever tried to get close, Tin had closed his heart off to the world, until the day he met Can (Rathavit Kijworalak). An innocent and rather impressionable young man, Can had never met anyone quite like Tin. An incorruptible soul, Can’s sweetness left an indelible impression on Tin and their friendship blossomed overnight. However, as Tin and Can drew closer, Tin began to realize his feelings for his friend were quickly becoming much stronger than those of simple friendship. Mustering the courage to tell Can how he felt, Tin admitted his feelings for his friend, but Can could not accept them. Heartbroken, Tin must now decide where things go from here. Does he give up on the boy who stole his heart? Or does he hold onto the hope that eventually, true love will conquer all?

Cast

Main character
 Tanapon Sukumpantanasan (Perth) as Ae Intouch
 Suppapong Udomkaewkanjana (Saint) as Pete Pichaya (season 1; flashbacks season 2)
 Phiravich Attachitsataporn (Mean) as Tin Medthanan
 Rathavit Kijworalak (Plan) as Can Kirakorn
 Napat na Ranong(Gun) as Techno
 Siwat Jumlongkul (Mark) as Kengkla
 Kirati Puangmalee (Title) as Tum
 Katsamonnat Namwirote (Earth) as Tar

Supporting character

Introduced in season one 
 Surat Permpoonsawat (Yacht) as Pond
 Nachjaree Horvejkul (Cherreen) as ChaAim
 Pirapat Watthanasetsiri (Earth) as Type
 Phurin Ruangvivatjarus (M) as Trump
 Preya Wongrabeb as Can's Mom
 Apasiri Nitibhon (Um) as Pete's Mom
 Chutima Limcharoenrat as Nat
 Vitthawat Singlampong as Oh
 Vittawin Veeravidhayanant (Best) as Good
 Kris Songsamphant as Technic
 Samantha Melanie Coates as Bow
 Praphatthon Chakkhuchan (James) as Ping
 Channanda Chieovisaman (Ew) as Champ
 Mudchima Pluempitiviriyavaj (Bua) as Chompoo
 Pannin Charnmanoon (Pineare) as Daily
 Praeploy Oree as Lemon
 Thanaboon Wanlopsirinan (Na) as Tul
 Chonrawee Chutiwatkhachonchai as Ae's Mom

Introduced in season two 
 Nichakoon Khajornborirak (Meen) as Tul
 Ravipon Sangaworawong (Est) as Gonhin
 Pisitpon Ekpongpisit (Jump) as Job
 Krittin Sosungnern (Krit) as Mai
 Thapanat Athikompokin (Boss) as Keen

Soundtracks 
 Dew Arunpong - Mai Wah Arai (Wish This Love) (opening theme)
 Boy Sompob - Kor (Wish)
 Boy Sompob feat. Catchy - Na Na Na
 Various Artist - Sun (Shake) (Love Sick The Series OST)
 Stamp - Supermarket

Awards 

 KoreanUpdates Awards 2018 - Asian Drama of The Year
 KoreanUpdates Awards 2018 - Asian Artist of The Year (Tanapon Sukumpantanasan)
 LINE TV AWARDS 2019 - Best Kiss Scene (Tanapon Sukumpantanasan and Suppapong Udomkaewkanjana)
 LINE TV AWARDS 2019 - Best Couple (Tanapon Sukumpantanasan and Suppapong Udomkaewkanjana)
KAZZ AWARDS 2019 - Rising Male Star of the Year 2019 (Suppapong Udomkaewkanjana)

References

External links 
 นิยาย My Accidental Love is You รักนี้บังเอิญคือคุณ
 

Thai boys' love television series
2010s college television series
2018 Thai television series debuts
2018 Thai television series endings
Thai television soap operas
GMM 25 original programming
2010s LGBT-related drama television series